The Trial of the Sixteen ("Процесс 16-ти" in Russian) was a trial of sixteen members of the Narodnaya volya in Russian Empire on October 25–30 (November 6–11), 1880.

The trial took place at a district military court in St.Petersburg. Members of the Executive Committee of Narodnaya Volya - Aaron Zundelevich, Aleksandr Kvyatkovsky and Stepan Shiryaev - were the principal defendants. Nikolai Bukh, S.A.Ivanova, Andrei Presnyakov and others were also on trial. All of the defendants were accused of being associated with the Narodnaya volya. Kvyatkovsky was also incriminated with planning two assassination attempts on the tsar on April 2, 1879 and February 5, 1880. Shiryaev was also accused of planning to murder the tsar on November 19, 1879. Later on, it turned out that I.F.Okladsky was agent provocateur. As a result, Kvyatkovsky and Presnyakov were sentenced to death, four other people - to eternal katorga, 6 other - to 4 to 20 years of katorga, and the remaining four - to Siberian exile.

References 

1880 in case law
Politics of the Russian Empire
19th century in the Russian Empire
1880 in the Russian Empire
Law articles needing an infobox